Alan Maxwell Boisragon (22 January 1860 – 18 March 1922) was a British Army officer, and author, and was Captain Superintendent of the Shanghai Municipal Police from 1901 to 1906.

Life
Born in Bengal, India, on 22 January 1860, the son of an army officer of Huguenot ancestry, Major-General Theodore Boisragon, CB, A. M. His father divorced his wife, Margaret Emma Boisragon (born Gerrard), in 1864 after she ran off with Charles William Moore, a judge in Bengal. Charles and Margaret's children included Ethel Moore, his half-sister, who was born in 1867.

Boisragon entered the Royal Military College, Sandhurst in 1878, and served in the Royal Irish Regiment—with seven years in India, and action in the 1884-85 Nile expedition—until 1891, when he retired. He joined the colonial service in the Gold Coast, where he initially served as Assistant Inspector of Constabulary. In 1894 he was appointed Commandant of the newly established Niger Coast Protectorate Force, in which position he came to know Roger Casement. In January 1897 he was only one of two survivors of a small British expedition to Benin which was attacked and defeated, the incident prompting the Benin Expedition of 1897. Boisragon published his account of the incident as The Benin Massacre in 1897. He then rejoined the Royal Irish Regiment as a captain in the 3rd Battalion, its Militia battalion.

In early 1901 Boisragon was seconded from the army, and appointed Captain Superintendent of the Shanghai Municipal Police, arriving in March 1901 to take over command. He was forced to resign in the aftermath of the 1905 Shanghai Mixed Court Riot. In 1915 Boisragon published a book for boys, Jack Scarlett Sandhurst cadet: A story for boys, with illustrations by J. F. Campbell. He died in London on 18 March 1922.

Family
He married Ethel Rosling on 9 January 1893 at South Nutfield, Christ Church, Surrey, England. Their son Leslie Alan Maxwell Boisragon was born in 1909 in Shanghai, China.

Boisragon's first cousin Guy Hudleston Boisragon was awarded the Victoria Cross in 1891.

References 

(Citing this Record
"England and Wales Marriage Registration Index, 1837-2005," database, FamilySearch)
(Citing this Record
"England and Wales Census, 1911," database, FamilySearch)

Bibliography 
 Captain Alan Boisragon, The Benin Massacre (London: Methuen, 1897)

External links 
 
 Artist's proofs and correspondence for 'Jack Scarlett' by Major Alan Boisragon

British colonial officials
Graduates of the Royal Military College, Sandhurst
Royal Irish Regiment (1684–1922) officers
British Army personnel of the Mahdist War
Gold Coast (British colony) people
1860 births
1922 deaths